The National Arts Festival (NAF) is an annual festival of performing arts in Grahamstown, South Africa. It is the largest arts festival on the African continent and one of the largest performing arts festivals in the world by visitor numbers.

The festival runs for 11 days, from the last week of June to the first week of July every year. It takes place in the small university city of Makhanda (previously known as Grahamstown), in the Eastern Cape province of South Africa.

The NAF comprises a Main programme and a Fringe festival, both administered by the National Arts Festival Office, a non-profit Section 21 Company. The Festival programme includes performing arts (theatre, dance, stand-up comedy and live music), visual art exhibitions, films, talks and workshops, a large food and craft fair and historical tours of the city. The NAF runs a children's arts festival over the same period and a number of other festivals take place in Makhanda over the period of the NAF, such as the National Youth Jazz Festival.

Performances take place across the city in approximately 60 venues (such as theatres, churches, schools) as well as in various outdoor locations for the street performances.

The Festival attracts significant numbers of local and international visitors and is one of the biggest contributors to the economy of the region.

The main programme 

A committee of curators in the various disciplines selects the content of the main programme. The planning process takes into account what is available locally and from outside South Africa. Three considerations that influence decisions are the artistic merits of any submission, the creation of a varied and balanced programme, and the costs involved.

The fringe 

Today, the Fringe is on an equal footing with the Main Festival. Seasoned performers and famous directors can just as easily be found on either programme, and a slot on the main programme one year does not preclude a return to the Fringe the next. The distinguishing feature of the Fringe is that it is open to all and exempt from the selection process that applies to the main programme. Fringe participants are responsible for their own costs and 85% of their box office sales accrue to them directly. They are liable for certain payments for venue hire and registration fees.

Subsidiary festivals 

A number of subsidiary festivals take place as part of the National Arts Festival:
 Think Fest
 Spiritfest
 Wordfest
 National Youth Jazz Festival
 Fingo Festival
 Creativate Digital Arts Festival
 National Schools Festival

Young Artist Awards 

The Young Artist Awards, sponsored by Standard Bank, are presented by the National Arts Festival Artistic Committee to emerging, relatively young South African artists who have demonstrated exceptional ability in their chosen fields but who have not yet achieved national exposure and acclaim.

Festival Committee members, fellow artists and interested members of the public, nominate artists. The NAF Committee, a group of experts in the various arts disciplines, decides on the final recipients.

Designed to encourage the recipients in the pursuit of their careers, a key aspect of the awards is that they guarantee the artists a place on the main programme of the forthcoming National Arts Festival. Apart from a cash prize, each of the winners receive substantial financial backing for their Festival participation whether this involves the mounting of an exhibition or the staging of a production.

A maximum of five awards are made annually in any one of the disciplines of drama, music, jazz, visual art, dance and film. Since the inception of the awards in 1981 more than 150 awards have been presented plus five special awards to artists in recognition of their contribution to the National Arts Festival and the arts of South Africa. A complete list of previous winners is as follows:

Fringe awards 

In 2010, the National Arts Festival launched a new set of awards for Fringe productions – the Standard Bank Ovation Awards. These awards recognise excellence on the Fringe, and aim to seek out those productions that are innovative, original and creatively outstanding. At the end of the Festival, Gold and Silver awards are selected from the list of winners, rewarding the best productions in the categories theatre, dance, comedy, music.

Recipients of the Standard Bank Ovation Awards benefit from the recognition provided by the acknowledgement, with companies or artists often being offered extended tours, international opportunities to perform, increased opportunities for funding, and an invitation to submit a proposal for the following year's Arena programme. Artists who win Gold and Silver awards receive modest monetary incentives.

In 2014, the Festival launched the Adelaide Tambo Award for Human Rights in the Arts to "honour an artist or company whose work on the Fringe programme embodies Adelaide Tambo's passion for the arts and her deep commitment for human rights."

Featured Artists 

Since the Featured Artist Programme was launched in 2012, the National Arts Festival has celebrated and showcased established artists who have built up a substantial body of work that has contributed to South Africa’s national discourse on race, class or gender in a significant way.

Recipients of this award are:
 2020: Madosini, traditional musician 
 2019: Bernie Searle, visual artist
 2018: Mamela Nyamza, dancer and choreographer 
 2017: Neo Muyanga, musician and composer
 2016: Lara Foot, playwright and director
 2015: Satire (The genre was chosen as the programme centrepiece)
 2014: Sylvaine Strike, actor and director
 2013: Mike van Graan, playwright and director

Growth and development 

The NAF has grown since its inception. In 1974 there were 64 events on the main programme. (Events refer to productions, exhibitions, workshops, lectures, tours and so forth. A drama or dance production is counted as a single event irrespective of how many times it may be performed.) The Fringe started in 1979 with 10 events. As of 2010 the National Arts Festival comprises more than 350 events with over 1,200 performances.

Social responsibility 

The National Arts Festival claims to be a socially responsible festival, this however, has been contested.

The Hands On! Masks Off! programme focuses on strengthening the entrepreneurial skills of the arts community by bringing together arts entrepreneurs to share skills and knowledge with a new generation of arts managers.

In 2010 the Remix Laboratory saw a 120 community-based artists from around the country participate in a residency programme during the NAF. The scholars attended workshops, seminars, performances and visits to galleries while being mentored in arts practice and arts appreciation.

The Art Factory teaches local marginalised and vulnerable youth performance skills such as juggling and acrobatics and combines this with a strategic focus on building the life skills and confidence of the youth. The Art Factory functions as a year-round project in Makhanda.

As part of the ArtsReach Programme the National Arts Festival takes the arts to hospitals, clinics, old age homes and rural areas. A number of artists on the Fringe volunteer their performances for the ArtsReach programme during the NAF.

The Arts Encounter Project distributes a number of tickets to indigent individuals to enable them to enjoy productions from the NAF's main and fringe programmes.

Staff 

The National Arts Festival has a small permanent staff comprising around 10 full-time staff members. Nobesuthu Rayi is the Executive Producer  and Rucera Seethal the Artistic Director.

Former radio presenter and sponsorship manager Tony Lankester served as CEO for over a decade, stepping down in 2019 to take up a position in the UK. During Lankester's tenure, respected arts administrator Ismail Mahomed served as Artistic Director until 2016. Mahomed was responsible for overseeing the curation of the NAF's artistic content. He was replaced by playwright and arts administrator  Ashraf Johaardien, who left at the end of 2018.

During the Festival, the staff complement grows to around 400, including technical staff, largely drawn from the local community of MMakhanda.

International partnerships 

The National Arts Festival is a member of the World Fringe Alliance, a grouping of 10 Fringe Festivals from different countries. It is also a member of the African Festival Network (AFRIFESTNET). CEO Tony Lankester is chairman and Treasurer of the two organisations respectively. The NAF embarks on numerous partnerships with foreign embassies and presenting institutions, staging several high-profile international works each year.

See also

Notes and references

Sources

External links 

 

1973 establishments in South Africa
Annual events in South Africa
Arts festivals in South Africa
Festivals established in 1973
July events
June events
Recipients of the Molteno medal
Theatre festivals in South Africa
Tourist attractions in the Eastern Cape
Winter events in South Africa